Ernest Frederick Burns Blyth (11 July 1872 – 1 November 1933) was an Australian politician in Tasmania.

He was born in Franklin in Tasmania. In 1913 he was elected to the Tasmanian House of Assembly as a Liberal member for Wilmot. A Nationalist from 1917, he joined the Country Party in 1922. Blyth was defeated in 1925 and died in Kimberley in 1933.

References

1872 births
1933 deaths
Nationalist Party of Australia members of the Parliament of Tasmania
National Party of Australia members of the Parliament of Tasmania
Members of the Tasmanian House of Assembly